Keith Bishop (born March 10, 1957) is a former guard in the National Football League (NFL) who played ten seasons for the Denver Broncos. He was a Pro Bowler in 1986 and 1987.

After a career in Dallas, TX with the DEA, Bishop returned to football and the Denver Broncos in 2007, as an offensive line coaching intern. He was married to Mary Bishop, and they are the parents of son, John, and daughters, Rachel and Sarah.

Bishop currently serves as the Broncos' vice president of security.

References

1957 births
Living people
Players of American football from San Diego
American football offensive guards
Nebraska Cornhuskers football players
Baylor Bears football players
Denver Broncos players
American Conference Pro Bowl players
Drug Enforcement Administration personnel
Ed Block Courage Award recipients